Mohammed Abdul-Zahra  or simply Abu Haloub (born 14 October 1989) is an Iraqi footballer who plays as a defender for Al-Minaa.

Career

Club career

International career
Goals for Iraq

Honours

Club
Al-Zawraa
Iraqi Premier League: 2017–18
Iraq FA Cup: 2018–19
Iraqi Super Cup: 2017

Country
 2013 World Men's Military Cup: Champions

External links
Profile on Goalzz.com

Iraqi footballers
Iraq international footballers
Living people
1989 births
Al-Talaba SC players
Al-Mina'a SC players
Association football defenders